The Sports Merit Medal (Portuguese: Medalha de Mérito Desportivo) is an award established by the Government of Macau in 2001 to recognize significant contributions to sports of Macau.

Recipients

References 

Orders, decorations, and medals of Macau
Awards established in 2001
2001 establishments in Macau